Carlos Samuel Estévez (born December 28, 1992) is a Dominican professional baseball pitcher for the Los Angeles Angels of Major League Baseball (MLB). He has previously played in MLB for the Colorado Rockies.

Career

Colorado Rockies
Estévez signed with the Rockies as a free agent in 2011, at the age of 18. After the 2015 season, the Rockies added Estévez to their 40-man roster. He promoted the major leagues on April 22, 2016. He made his debut on April 23. When Rockies' closer Jake McGee went on the disabled list in June, Estévez became the Rockies' new closer. He finished the season with 63 appearances and 11 saves.

On April 3, 2017, Estévez pitched a hitless sixth, earning the win against the Milwaukee Brewers on Opening Day. On June 18, 2017, Carlos got called back up from Triple-A Albuquerque to the Rockies to replace Chad Qualls, who went to the 10-Day DL. Estévez came in with the Rockies having given up the lead in the 9th inning to the San Francisco Giants trying to hold the score of 5 to 3 with a runner on second base, and got a strike out of Buster Posey to end the top of the 9th to prevent further damage. After a Rockies' 9th inning rally of three straight 1-out singles, Nolan Arenado hit a walk-off three-run home run to complete his first career cycle, improving Carlos' record to 4-0 on the year. In 35 appearances, he finished with a record of 5-0 and an ERA of 5.57.

He missed the entire 2018 season following a couple of injuries and remaining in the AAA level. The following season, Estévez was a mainstay in the Rockies bullpen, becoming one of the most effective relievers for the team. He finished with a 3.75 ERA and 81 strikeouts in 71 games. As many of the pitching staff in 2020, Estévez's performance regressed from the previous season as he allowed 21 runs in 24 innings pitched. In 2021, he pitched in 64 games, posting an ERA of 4.38 with 11 saves.

Los Angeles Angels
On December 5, 2022, Estévez signed a two-year, $13.5 million contract with the Los Angeles Angels.

References

External links

1992 births
Living people
Albuquerque Isotopes players
Asheville Tourists players
Colorado Rockies players
Dominican Republic expatriate baseball players in the United States
Dominican Summer League Rockies players
Grand Junction Rockies players
Major League Baseball pitchers
Major League Baseball players from the Dominican Republic
Modesto Nuts players
New Britain Rock Cats players
Salt River Rafters players
Sportspeople from Santo Domingo
Tri-City Dust Devils players